Facelina olivacea is a species of sea slug, an aeolid nudibranch, a marine gastropod mollusc in the family Facelinidae.

Distribution
This species was described from Table Bay Harbour and Saldanha, Western Cape,  South Africa. It is endemic to the Cape Province of South Africa. It has also been found at Knysna and Jeffrey's Bay, Eastern Cape on the Indian Ocean coast.

References

Facelinidae
Gastropods described in 1954